Jean Carlet is a French doctor specializing in internal medicine, infectious diseases, and intensive care.

Dr. Carlet is engaged in the public education of health-related topics, especially antibiotic resistance. He has provided expert input for the Government of France, and the World Health Organization.

His contributions to public health have been highlighted by Le Monde, France Culture, Le Figaro, La Croix, and Libération.

References

External links 
 

Year of birth missing (living people)
Living people
French public health doctors